Sümi, also Sema, is a Sino-Tibetan language spoken in Nagaland, India. It is spoken by the Sümi Naga people. It differs from every other Naga languages due to the presence of guttural sounds.

Geographical distribution
Sümi is spoken in central and southern Nagaland, mainly in Zünheboto District and parts of Niuland District, Dimapur District, Chümoukedima District, Kohima District, Mokokchung District and Kiphire District, as well as in 7 villages of Tinsukia District, Assam (Ethnologue).

Dialects
Ethnologue lists the following dialects of Sümi.

Dayang (Western Sümi)
Lazami
Jimomi
Zumomi

Phonology 
The transcriptions in this section use the International Phonetic Alphabet.

Vowels 

The vowels of Sümi are as follows:

Notes:
 The close front and the close central vowels have been variously described as near-close  and close . The close back vowel has only been described as close .
 In the word-medial position,  can be realized as mid .
 The mid vowels  can be realized as either close-mid  or open-mid .
  has been variously described as near-open  and open .
 After uvular stops,  can be realized as open back unrounded .

Consonants 

The consonants of Sümi are as follows:

References

Bibliography

External links
 Sümi DoReCo corpus compiled by Amos Teo. Audio recordings of narrative texts with transcriptions time-aligned at the phone level, translations, and time-aligned morphological annotations.

Languages of Nagaland
Angami–Pochuri languages